Yasir Akhtar (born 23 November 1972) is a Pakistani-British filmmaker, singer, songwriter, actor, director and producer. Akhtar is also the owner of film production company called Pegasus Productions

Early life and education
Akhtar was born in a Pakistani Business class family to Mohammad Akhtar Shafi and Rizwana Akhtar where his father Mohammad Akhtar Shafi was a businessman,his siblings including Shazia Akhtar and Aamer Akhter has also been into the showbiz industry. He graduated from Government College of Commerce and Economics, Karachi. Akhtar's mother, Rizwana Akhtar is the elder sister of Javed Jabbar. Before the Pakistan-India partition, Akhtar's maternal grandfather, Ahmed Abdul Jabbar, served as an official of the Government in Nizam of Hyedrabad Deccan - India. Akhtar spent most of his childhood working alongside his first cousin Mehreen Jabbar (filmmaker) at his uncle Javed Jabbar's company

Career in music and performances 
Akhtar started his singing career as a vocalist in the band The Arid Zone in 1989. 'The Arid Zone' launched their first album in 1993 through EMI Pakistan. Later he also produced and performed in various songs as a musician and singer like Kabhi Tu Hoga Mera Milan, 
Chandni, Teray Naal Dil, Jogi, Zara Man Ko Dekhna, Aey Sanam, My love, Chan Mai, Laut Aao Na, Choom Loo Aasman, Sansani, Araam Naal Kar, Assalamualaika Ya Nabi(SAW) etc. Akhtar also performed in various countries like UK, USA, Pakistan, Greece, Spain, UAE etc.

Akhtar launched the musical band ‘The Arid Zone’ with his friends Kamran Jelani (Keyboards) and Shareb Jaffer (Guitarist). The trio started touring nationwide after the release of the first album 'The Arid Zone-Vol1.

Besides performing in Pakistan and United Kingdom, Akhtar has performed internationally in New York, Chicago, California, Washington DC, Greece, Spain and more. Akhtar's musical performances and interviews have been aired on B4U Music, Zee TV, MTV Pakistan, PTV Network, Sony Entertainment, BBC Asian Network  and many other prominent television channels.

Releases 
‘The Arid Zone - Vol 1’ was released by  EMI Pakistan in 1994. Later, Akhtar released ‘The Arid Zone-Jogi’ and ‘Yasir-My Love’. Akhtar has performed the following songs like Kabhi tu Hoga Mera Milan, Chandni, Laut Aao Na, Teray Naal Dil, Zara Man Ko Dekhna, Jogi, Choom Lo Aasmaan Ko, Sohniyeah, Pyar Diyan Gallan, My Love, Aey Sanam, Chan Mai and many more. Akhtar's musical albums were sponsored by Mobilink, Jazz, English Biscuits, Peek Freans, Phillips and other multinational companies.

The musical group 'The Arid Zone' released their second album ‘The Arid Zone - Jogi’in 1997. In 2001, Akhtar released a solo album ‘Yasir-My Love'. The album released successful songs like Aye Sanam, My Love, Chan Mai, SurMai Sey Shaam and many more. The music videos of this album launched the careers of Zara Sheikh (filmstar) and Tooba Siddiqui (model and actress). In 2015, Akhtar went to Turkey to film the music video of the single Sansani - The Sensation. In London, he shot a folk-rap song Araam Naal Kar - Take it Easy in 2018. Some parts of the ‘Take it Easy’ were derived from popular Sufi poet Bulleh Shah. The rap part was written by himself. Akhtar recorded 'Assalamulalaika Ya Nabi" a Naat/Nasheed in 2019 and released it internationally.

As an actor
Akhtar started his career as a child actor in Pakistan's English feature film 'Beyond the Last Mountain'. Akhtar kept on appearing in TV commercials in school days. When Akhtar was 16 years old, he appeared with his younger sister Shazia Akhtar in PTV Network's drama serial 'Dastak' produced by Shahzad Khalil. As a teenager, he appeared as a model in TV commercials of English Biscuits, Peek Freans, Rafhan, Gillette and many other companies. Meanwhile, in the college, Akhtar started appearing as hero in Pakistan's national network's major drama serials. Naming few drama serials where his work was acknowledged were - Tapish, Khawab Suhanay, Yeh Jahan, Kallo, Monsoon, Phir Yun Hua, Machar Party Aaway see Aaway etc.

As director and producer 
Akhtar got his first assignment as a Director and Producer at an early age, The executive producer of Combine Productions Ghazanfer Ali gave him work to direct and produce Music Channel Charts in 1994, it was the very first pop chart show of Pakistan. Akhtar also launched the musical drama serial ‘French Toast’ based on a story of the struggle of musical band in 1995. 'French Toast' was aired on Zee TV in the UK and U.S.A as well as on NTM in Pakistan.

Akhtar also produced the first ever telefilm series of Pakistan called Tapal Cinema. The project had six telefilms namely Rahain, Titlee, Shehzadi, Zeher, Chand and Kashish.  Akhtar's ‘Tapal Cinema’ launched the careers of Humayun Saeed, Shamoon Abbasi, Javeria Abbasi, Zubair Abbasi and many others.

Mere Ghar Aik Whirlpool was also a known drama serial of Pakistan in 1999 created by Akhtar. The style of brand placement associated with entertainment made the serial popular as Whirlpool name was used in the drama, This idea turned to be profitable for the creators and started a new trend of branded drama serials in Pakistan. The project was sponsored by Phillips - Whirlpool. Artists Like Nida Yasir, Adeel Hayat Ansari, Naeem Shaikh, Salman Saqib Sheikh (Hira Mani’s husband) and many others were introduced to the industry with Mera Ghar Aik Whirlpool.

British Asian drama serial Sard Aag-Cold Fire was produced by Akhtar in 2006. which was filmed in Manchester and London and was aired on Hum TV, for which Akhtar also auditioned new talent from places like Birmingham, London and Manchester. where he Introduced Jessica Bath, Mani Liaqat, Ali Khalid etc. 'Sard Aag' also had actors like Abid Ali, Noman Ijaz, Shalaka Ranadive in the cast list. Akhtar has also organizied events for [High Commission for Pakistan] and Bradford. Akhtar’s productions has been broadcast on channels like BBC, PTV Home, Zee TV, Sony TV, B4U Music, Geo TV, ARY digital.

Protégé 
Through Music Channel Charts, Akhtar introduced artists like Shehzad Roy, Fakhar-e-Alam, Najam Sheraz, Komal Rizvi, Fringe Benefits, Jazba, Nadeem Jafri, Azfar Ali and many more to the Pakistani Entertainment Industry. Akhtar produced and directed 50 episodes of pop chart show Music Channel Charts.
As a director and producer, Akhtar launched the careers of many artists like Armeena Rana Khan, Tooba Siddiqui, Humayun Saeed, Nida Yasir, Javeria Abbasi, Fakhr e Alam, Najam Sheraz, Komal Rizvi, Shehzad Roy, Shamoon Abbasi and various other artists to the Pakistani Industry.

Acting, direction and production

Musical work

Music videos - production work

References

Pakistani playback singers
Pakistani male actors
1972 births
Living people